Jhenaidah is a city in the Khulna Division of south-western Bangladesh. Jhenaidah is the headquarters of Jhenaidah Sadar Upazila and Jhenaidah District. The city has a population of about 252 thousand, making it the 19th largest city in Bangladesh. It is the fourth largest city in the Khulna division, after Khulna, Kushtia, and Jessore.

Etymology
This area was once very popular for trading oysters. It is believed that this place might have originated its name from Jhinuk.

History
Jhenaidah the largest city of Jhenaidah District came into existence probably in the middle of eighteenth century. Previously it was a part of Greater Kushtia, itself once a part of Greater Nadia.

Demographic
Its total population is 252,500 of which 128,300 are males and 124,200 are females. The total number of households in the city is 60,900.

Administration
The city consists of a paurashava which is further divided into 9 wards and 34 Mahalla
Wards & included mahallas are

Transport
Jhenaidah is the road transport hub of its district. It is on the Daulatdia–Mongla Highway (N7). National highway N704 splits off the N7 north to Kushtia,  distant.

Education
The literacy rate (age 7 years and above) is 67.2%.
Jhenaidah is known as important educational city of Khulna division. Educational institutions of Jhenaidah city are
 Jhenaidah Cadet College (Almost every year, it becomes first in Jessore board)
 Government K.C. College Jhenaidah
 Jhenaidah Government High School
 Jhenaidah Government Girls High School
 Kanchannagar Model High School and College
 Shaheen Cadet School, Jhenaidah
 Institute of Health and Technology
 Jhenaidah Polytechnical Institute
 Agricultural Training Institute, Jhenaidah
 Naldanga Bhushan Shishu Academy, Kaliganj

Aside from these, there are Jhenaidah Government Veterinary College, Sheikh Kamal Textile Engineering College, and Islamic University Bangladesh outside Jhenaidah municipality.

References

Cities in Bangladesh
Populated places in Jhenaidah District